Bicosoecaceae is a family of bicosoecids in the order Bicosoecida.

The name of the type genus Bicosoeca described by James-Clark in 1866 is derived from Greek roots (vase, bowl, plus , inhabit). The philologically preferable compound would be Bicoeca, as "corrected" by Stein in 1878 and followed by most subsequent authors. However, according to the ICBN and ICZN, the original spelling of the name cannot be considered incorrect and it must be used in its original form.

References

External links 
 
 
 Bicosoecaceae at WoRMS

Bikosea
Heterokont families